Cathepsin F is a protein that in humans is encoded by the CTSF gene.

Cysteine cathepsins are a family of cysteine proteases that represent a major component of the lysosomal proteolytic system. In general, cathepsins contain a signal peptide, followed by a propeptide and then a catalytically active mature region. The very long (251-amino acid residues) proregion of the cathepsin F precursor contains a C-terminal domain similar to the pro-segment of Cathepsin L-like enzymes, a 50-residue flexible linker peptide, and an N-terminal domain predicted to adopt a cystatin-like fold. The cathepsin F proregion is unique within the papain family cysteine proteases in that it contains this additional N-terminal segment predicted to share structural similarities with cysteine protease inhibitors of the cystatin superfamily. This cystatin-like domain contains some of the elements known to be important for inhibitory activity. CTSF encodes a predicted protein of 484 amino acids that contains a 19-residue signal peptide. Cathepsin F contains five potential N-glycosylation sites, and it may be targeted to the endosomal/lysosomal compartment via the mannose 6-phosphate receptor pathway. The cathepsin F gene is ubiquitously expressed, and it maps to chromosome 11q13, close to the gene encoding cathepsin W.

Immunodiagnostics of Opisthorchis viverrini 
Cathepsin F can be used as an alternative way to test for the disease known as Opisthorchis Viverrini. In recent years, the diagnosis of Opisthorchis Viverrini has been done by stool examination and is considered to be the "gold standard" method. However, stool based diagnosis can be unreliable although it is a non-invasive method. Experiments preformed showed that by using Recombinant DNA techniques with Cathepsin F cysteine protease, can create far more reliable results.

Expression of Cathepsin F in Yesso Scallop (Mizuhopecten yessoensis) 
Recent experiments has shown the discovery of Cathepsin F in Yesso scallop (Mizuhopecten yessoensis). The identification of the Cathepsin F gene in various embryonic developmental stages of the Yesso Scallop has major importance. The Cathepsin F gene has an important role in the innate immune response. The Yesso Scallop has been suffering from high mortality due to bacterial diseases. The discovery of Cathepsin F can lead to farther research and a solution to the Yesso Scallop mortality problem.

References

Further reading

External links
 The MEROPS online database for peptidases and their inhibitors: C01.018

Proteases
EC 3.4.22
Cathepsins